Elvis Letaj (born 26 September 2003) is a professional footballer who plays as a left-back for Hajduk Split in the Croatian Football League. Born in Croatia, he is of Kosovar origin.

Club career

Hajduk Split
Born in Karlovac, Letaj grew up in Šibenik, where he practiced football for four years at the Joso Bego Football School, before impressing HNK Hajduk Split scouts and moving to their academy in the summer of 2017.

On 4 October 2020, Letaj made his debut with Hajduk Split II in a 3–2 home win against Dubrava after being named in the starting line-up. On 17 July 2022, he was named as a Hajduk Split substitute for the first time in a league match against Istra 1961 after a long time and good performances in the under-19 team. Three days later, Letaj signed his first professional contract with Hajduk after agreeing to a three-year deal.

Loan at Tabor Sežana
On 20 July 2022, Hajduk Split after signing a professional contract with Letaj, announced the loan of him to Slovenian PrvaLiga club Tabor Sežana. A day later, the club confirmed that Letaj's loan was a season-long loan. His debut with Tabor Sežana came three days after joining in a 1–2 home defeat against Olimpija Ljubljana after being named in the starting line-up. He returned to Hajduk during the winter break.

International career
In September 2019, Letaj becomes part of Croatia U17 with which he made his debut in a 3–1 home defeat against Slovakia U17 after coming on as a substitute at 46th minute in place of Fran Žilinski. On 15 September 2022, he received a call-up from Kosovo U21 for a training camp held in Antalya, Turkey and for the hybrid friendly match against Greenland.

References

External links

2003 births
Living people
Sportspeople from Karlovac
Croatian people of Kosovan descent
Croatian people of Albanian descent
Association football fullbacks
Kosovan footballers

Croatian footballers
Croatia youth international footballers
HNK Hajduk Split II players
HNK Hajduk Split players
NK Tabor Sežana players
First Football League (Croatia) players
Slovenian PrvaLiga players